Slinde Mounds State Preserve contains ancient Indian mound burials in some hill prairie. About  in extent, it is on a terrace above Canoe Creek, a tributary of the Upper Iowa River, and is approximately six miles from Waukon, Iowa in Hanover Township, in Allamakee County.

The state acquired the land in 1979. Since 1989 listed on the National Register of Historic Places. It receives its name from the family who sold the land to the state.

It is located in the Driftless Area of Iowa, a region which escaped being glaciated during the last ice age. It is adjacent to the Canoe Creek Wildlife Management Area and the Upper Iowa Access hunting area.

See also
List of Registered Historic Places in Iowa
Iowa archaeology
List of burial mounds in the United States

Sources
"Slinde Mounds", Iowa Department of Natural Resources, Retrieved July 14, 2007
Iowa DNR State Preserves, Retrieved July 14, 2007

Archaeological sites on the National Register of Historic Places in Iowa
Cemeteries on the National Register of Historic Places in Iowa
Driftless Area
Iowa state preserves
Mounds in Iowa
Native American history of Iowa
Protected areas of Allamakee County, Iowa
Protected areas established in 1989
Woodland period
National Register of Historic Places in Allamakee County, Iowa
Historic districts on the National Register of Historic Places in Iowa
Historic districts in Allamakee County, Iowa